Şemsi is a unisex Turkish given name. It may refer to:

People
 Şemsi Pasha (1492–1580), Ottoman statesman
 Shemsi Pasha (1846-1908), Ottoman general
 Şemsi Yaralı (born 1982), Turkish boxer
 Shemsi Beqiri (born 1986), Swiss-Albanian boxer

Other
 Şemsipaşa, Gaziosmanpaşa, a neighborhood of Istanbul's Gaziosmanpaşa district
 Şemsi Pasha Mosque, an Ottoman mosque in Istanbul's Üsküdar district
 Şemsipaşa Primary School, in Istanbul's Üsküdar district
 Shemsi (Also spelt Shamsi), a former sun-worshipping sect in Upper Mesopotamia

See also
 Shamsi (disambiguation)